Blind Folly is a 1939 British comedy film directed by Reginald Denham and starring Clifford Mollison, Lilli Palmer, and Leslie Perrins. The screenplay concerns a man who inherits a nightclub that belonged to his brother but soon discovers that it is the headquarters for a dangerous criminal gang.

It was made at Walton Studios as a quota quickie.

Cast
 Clifford Mollison as George Bunyard
 Lilli Palmer as Valerie
 Leslie Perrins as Deverell
 William Kendall as Raine
 Gus McNaughton as Professor Zozo
 Elliott Mason as Aunt Mona
 David Horne as Mr Steel
 Gertrude Musgrove as Agnes
 Roland Culver as Ford
 Anthony Holles as Louis
 Michael Ripper

References

Bibliography
 Chibnall, Steve. Quota Quickies: The Birth of the British 'B' Film. British Film Institute, 2007.
 Low, Rachael. Filmmaking in 1930s Britain. George Allen & Unwin, 1985.
 Wood, Linda. British Films, 1927-1939. British Film Institute, 1986.

External links

1939 films
1939 comedy films
British comedy films
Films directed by Reginald Denham
Films shot at Nettlefold Studios
Quota quickies
British black-and-white films
1930s English-language films
1930s British films